The Duchateau Islands are an island group in the Coral Sea, belonging to Papua New Guinea. They lie to the east of Panarairai Island in the Louisiade Archipelago.

Administrative
Politically they belong to the province of Milne Bay in the southeastern part of Papua New Guinea .
They are controlled by the chief of Utian Island, the nearest inhabited island.

Geography
The Duchateau Islands consist of three small low-lying islands. They lie on the southwestern edge of the barrier reef of Vanatinai.
Of the three islands, Pana Bobai Ana in the west is the largest. It was formerly inhabited (village of Salunol) but the people have moved to Utian. they come each year back to the island to harvest yams and claim coconuts. 
The two smaller islands, Pana Rura Wara and Kukuluba, are located on the north side of their shared lagoon.

References

Islands of Milne Bay Province
Louisiade Archipelago